The Michigan Defense Force (MIDF), formerly Michigan Volunteer Defense Force (MIVDF), is a military force, duly constituted as a state defense force and an element of Michigan Department of Military and Veterans Affairs. The MIDF is one of the three components of the military establishment of Michigan: the Army National Guard, the Air National Guard, and the Michigan Defense Force.

History

The early Michigan State Troops 
Michigan's first state defense force was established as the Michigan State Troops Home Guard along with the Michigan State Troops Permanent Force in Act No. 53 Public Acts of Michigan on 17 April 1917. The Michigan State Troops organizations served on in-state active duty during World Wars I, II, and the Korean War.

Michigan Emergency Volunteers 
The Michigan State Troops were reconstituted as the Michigan Emergency Volunteers by Public Act 246 of 1988. The original intention for the MEV was to act as a force of trained emergency volunteers in case the National Guard was sent out of the state in a national emergency. The MEV was ordered to stand down in October 1998.

Michigan Volunteer Defense Force / Michigan Defense Force 
The word "volunteer" has been dropped from the name. The Michigan Defense Force is the third branch of the Michigan Military Establishment along with the Michigan Army National Guard and Michigan Air National Guard. All the missions and training are done in Michigan. Drills are one weekend a month and training events are usually two weeks per year. Focus is on disaster response, search and rescue, first aid, military customs and courtesies, drill and ceremony, and much more. The Michigan Defense Force is a consideration for someone who has been in the military and wants to rejoin, or someone who has thought they missed a chance to serve. Maximum age currently accepted is 55.

Uniforms, training, and duties
The MIDF uniform differs slightly from the Army uniform; MIDF soldiers wear the state flag on their right shoulder instead of the American flag.

The MIDF is tasked with emergency management missions such as handling the reception, storage and stationing of the Strategic National Stockpile in Michigan, and supplying trained and uniformed Community Emergency Response Teams.

MIDF missions have included working alongside the Michigan Department of Military and Veterans Affairs in processing benefit applications for military veterans, and providing disaster response aid, including tree and debris removal, following tornado activity.

(2022) On its current website, the Michigan Defense Force mission is stated: TO PROVIDE READY AND ABLE MILITARY FORCES TO ASSIST STATE AND LOCAL AUTHORITIES IN TIMES OF STATE EMERGENCIES AND TO AUGMENT THE MICHIGAN ARMY NATIONAL GUARD AND MICHIGAN AIR NATIONAL GUARD AS REQUIRED.

See also
Michigan Naval Militia
Michigan Wing Civil Air Patrol

References

External links
  - Official Page - 2022
  - Requirements, Enlistment process, Contact info - 2022

Volunteer Defense Force
State defense forces of the United States
Volunteer Defense Force